LA Ink is an American reality television show on TLC that follows the events of the High Voltage Tattoo (and, later in the series, American Electric) tattoo studios in Los Angeles, California. The spin-off of TLC's Miami Ink, premiered on August 7, 2007.

In August 2011, TLC announced the cancellation ahead of the mid-season four premiere. However, the show was picked back up by the network, and continued for 3 more seasons. All 7 seasons are available for streaming on Amazon Prime Video.

Background 

After leaving the hit program Miami Ink because of a dispute with her fellow cast members, Kat Von D moved back to Los Angeles to open her own tattoo shop and was offered a spin-off show. Initially, she hired her close friend Amber "Pixie" Acia to be the shop manager, and her good friend Corey Miller as a tattoo artist. After considering many more artists for the job, Von D hired Hannah Aitchison and Kim Saigh to work for her as well. The cameras follow her as she opens the shop, while capturing everything that unfolds in between.

Each customer coming into the shop usually has a story or reason behind their tattoo. On occasion, even known celebrities make an appearance to get tattooed by Kat or one of the other artists.

Inevitably, as the show progressed, changes occurred. Von D fired Acia during the second part of Season 1. Saigh and Aitchison left the show after the Season 2 finale. Season 3 premiered with a new shop manager, former Rock of Love competitor Aubry Fisher, but she was fired by Von D in the mid-season 3 premiere after getting into a lot of trouble with most of the people at the shop.

Tattoo artist Amy Nicoletto was hired on a trial basis, but left to work at American Electric, owned by Craig Jackman. Tattoo artist Paulie Tattoo was also hired and quit to go to American Electric, because of lack of work. Fisher soon joined them as a "shop helper" at American Electric after she got fired from High Voltage. Fisher left to pursue her dream of becoming a make-up artist without telling Craig and was later fired from American Electric, but does make an appearance for two episodes in the fourth season when she appeared at the shop's 11th Anniversary as a guest.

Von D broke a Guinness world record on the show, tattooing 400 people with the "LA" part of the LA Ink logo in 24 hours, giving the money raised to charity. The record was broken in June 2008 by Kat's ex-husband Oliver Peck who tattooed 415 tattoos of the number "13".

During Season 3, Nikko Hurtado appears as a guest artist on the show several times while Von D's sister Karoline and her brother Michael also make appearances on the show.

American Electric was the competitor tattoo shop to High Voltage during Season 3 and the first half of Season 4.

Ratings
LA Ink premiered on August 7, 2007, averaging 2.9 million total viewers at its time slot. According to The Hollywood Reporter, the number had made the show the most-watched series debut for the cable channel at the time since the premiere of the U.S. version of What Not to Wear in January 2003. This was also the highest-rated series premiere in the history of TLC among adults 18–34, with a rating of 2.6 and a viewer count of 1.5 million. The premiere was also the highest-rated basic cable prime-time program August 7 among several major adult demographics, including 18–34, 18–49 and 25–54.

Cast 

Shop owner
 Kat Von D (High Voltage Tattoo)
 Craig Jackman (American Electric) (seasons 3–4)

Shop managers
 Pixie Acia (season 1)
 Naheed Simjee (season 2)
 Aubry Fisher (season 3)
 Liz Friedman (season 3)
 Adrienne Ironside (seasons 3–4)

Merchandising
 Michael Drachenberg (seasons 3–4)

Kat's Personal Assistant
 Karoline Drachenberg

Tattoo artists
 Corey Miller
 Hannah Aitchison (seasons 1–2)
 Kim Saigh (seasons 1–2)
 Dan Smith (seasons 3–4)
 Nikko Hurtado (seasons 3–4)
 Amy Nicoletto (seasons 3–4)
 Paulie Tattoo (season 3)
 Ruth "Ruthless" Pineda (season 4)
 Jeff Ward (season 4)
 Khoi Nguyen (season 4)
 Adam Forman (season 4)

Episodes

Series overview

Season 1 (2007–08)

Season 2 (2008–09)

Season 3 (2009–10)

Season 4 (2010–11)

See also
List of tattoo TV shows

References

External links

 
 
 High Voltage Tattoo website
 Kat Von D website
 Making LA Ink, DV Magazine
 Members of the cast, Inked Magazine
 Q&A with Pixie Acia of LA Ink
 Kim Saigh, Inked Magazine

2007 American television series debuts
2011 American television series endings
2000s American reality television series
2010s American reality television series
English-language television shows
Television series set in tattoo shops
Television shows set in Los Angeles
Reality television spin-offs
TLC (TV network) original programming
American television spin-offs